Honduras is divided into 18 departments (Spanish: departamentos). Each department is headed by a governor, who is appointed by the President of Honduras. The governor represents the executive branch in the region in addition to acting as intermediary between municipalities and various national authorities; resolves issues arising between municipalities; oversees the penitentiaries and prisons in his department; and regularly works with the various Secretaries of State that form the President's Cabinet. To be eligible for appointment as a governor, the individual must: a) live for five consecutive years in the department; b) be Honduran; c) be older than 18 years of age and; d) know how to read and write.

Evolution of Honduras's territorial organization

1825: The constitutional congress convened in that year orders that the state be divided into seven departments: Comayagua, Santa Bárbara, Tegucigalpa, Choluteca, Yoro, Olancho, and Gracias (later renamed Lempira).

1834: An extraordinary constitutional assembly reduces the number of departments to four: this attempt fails to prosper, and the 1825 division remains in force.

1869: Congress orders the creation of the departments of La Paz (broken away from Comayagua), El Paraíso (from Tegucigalpa and Olancho), Copán (from Gracias), and La Mosquitia (from Yoro).

1872: A department called Victoria is ordered to be split from Choluteca, but this never comes into effect. Islas de la Bahía department is founded (the islands were ceded to Honduras by the United Kingdom in 1860).

1881: La Mosquitia joined with portions of Yoro to form Colón department.

1883: Intibucá department is formed from sections of La Paz and Gracias.

1893: Valle department (split from Choluteca) and Cortés department (split from Santa Bárbara) are created.

1902: Parts of Yoro and Colón are taken to form the new department of Atlántida.

1906: Ocotepeque department is created by dividing the territory of Copán.

1957: Colón is divided in two to create Gracias a Dios department.

Departments of Honduras 

Population data source:

See also 
 
Municipalities of Honduras
List of Honduras-related topics
List of Honduran departments by Human Development Index
ISO 3166-2:HN

References

External links
  Interactive Map of Honduras 
  Statoids: Departments of Honduras
 
 
  Honduras distance Calculator

 
Subdivisions of Honduras
Honduras, Departments
Honduras 1
Departments, Honduras
Honduras geography-related lists